The Embassy of Liberia in Washington, D.C. is the diplomatic mission of the Republic of Liberia to the United States. It is located at 5201 16th Street Northwest, Washington, D.C. in the 16th Street Heights neighborhood. The property was initially purchased to be the ambassador's residence, but Ambassador Charles D.B. King later purchased a different residence.

See also
Liberia – United States relations

References

External links
Official website

Liberia
Washington, D.C.
Liberia–United States relations